North Northamptonshire is one of two local authority areas in Northamptonshire, England. It is a unitary authority area forming about one half of the ceremonial county of Northamptonshire. It was created in 2021. Its notable towns are Kettering, Corby, Wellingborough, Rushden, Raunds, Desborough, Rothwell, Irthlingborough, Thrapston and Oundle. The council is based at the Corby Cube in Corby.

It has a string of lakes along the Nene Valley Conservation Park, associated heritage railway, the village of Fotheringhay which has tombs of the House of York as well as a towering church supported by flying buttresses. This division has a well-preserved medieval castle in private hands next to Corby – Rockingham Castle – and about 20 other notable country houses, many of which have visitor gardens or days.

History
North Northamptonshire was created on 1 April 2021 by the merger of the four non-metropolitan districts of Corby, East Northamptonshire, Kettering, and Wellingborough. It absorbed the functions of these districts, plus those of the abolished Northamptonshire County Council.

In March 2018, following financial and cultural mismanagement by the cabinet and officers at Northamptonshire County Council, the then Secretary of State for Local Government, Sajid Javid, sent commissioner Max Caller into the council, who recommended the county council and all-district and borough councils in the county be abolished, and replaced by two unitary authorities, one covering the West, and one the North of the county. These proposals were approved in April 2019. It meant that the districts of Daventry, Northampton, and South Northamptonshire were merged to form a new unitary authority called West Northamptonshire, whilst the second unitary authority North Northamptonshire consists of the former Corby, East Northamptonshire, Kettering, and Wellingborough districts.

Council

Elections for a shadow authority were due to be held on Thursday 7 May 2020, but were postponed due to the COVID-19 pandemic. These elections were instead held on 6 May 2021 and the Conservatives won a majority of seats. The Council comprises 78 councillors elected across 26 wards.

The Council logo depicts Rockingham Castle, the River Welland and a Red kite - a bird of prey that has become strongly associated with the county of Northamptonshire and is particularly commonplace in the north-eastern parts of the county around Corby and Rockingham Forest.

Settlements and parishes
Achurch, Aldwincle, Apethorpe, Ashley, Ashton
Barnwell, Barton Seagrave, Benefield, Blatherwycke, Bozeat, Brampton Ash, Braybrooke,  Brigstock, Broughton, Bulwick, Burton Latimer
Chelveston cum Caldecott, Clopton, Corby, Collyweston, Cotterstock, Cottingham, Cranford, Cransley
Deene, Deenethorpe, Denford, Desborough, Dingley, Duddington-with-Fineshade
Earls Barton, East Carlton, Easton Maudit, Easton on the Hill, Ecton
Finedon, Fotheringhay
Geddington, Glapthorn, Grafton Underwood, Great Addington, Great Doddington, Great Harrowden, Grendon, Gretton,
Hardwick, Hargrave, Harrington, Harringworth, Hemington, Higham Ferrers
Irchester, Irthlingborough, Islip, Isham
Kettering, King's Cliffe
Laxton, Lilford-cum-Wigsthorpe, Little Addington, Little Harrowden, Little Irchester, Loddington, Lowick, Luddington, Lutton
Mawsley, Mears Ashby, Middleton
Nassington, Newton and Little Oakley, Newton Bromswold
Orlingbury, Orton, Oundle
Pilton, Polebrook, Pytchley
Raunds, Ringstead, Rockingham, Rothwell, Rushden, Rushton
Shotley, Southwick, Stanion, Stanwick, Stoke Doyle, Stoke Albany, Strixton, Sudborough, Sutton Bassett, Sywell
Tansor, Thorpe Malsor, Thorpe Waterville, Thrapston, Thurning, Titchmarsh, Twywell
Wadenhoe, Wakerley, Warkton, Warmington, Weekley, Weldon, Wellingborough, Weston by Welland, Wilbarston, Wilby, Wollaston, Northamptonshire,Woodford, Woodnewton, Wollaston
Yarwell

See also
2019–2023 structural changes to local government in England
2021 North Northamptonshire Council election
West Northamptonshire for the other unitary authority created in Northamptonshire in April 2021.

References

External links

North Northamptonshire Council

 
Local government districts of the East Midlands
Local government in Northamptonshire
Unitary authority districts of England